Robert Bruce Foote (22 September 1834 – 29 December 1912) was a British geologist and archaeologist who conducted geological surveys of prehistoric locations in India for the Geological Survey of India. For his contributions to Indian archaeology, he is called the father of Indian prehistory

Foote joined the Geological Survey of India (GSI) on 29 December 1858 was posted in the Madras Presidency, Hyderabad region and Bombay. In 1887 he became a Director of the GSI and on retiring in 1891, he joined the state of Baroda.

In later life, he settled in Yercaud where his father-in-law Reverend Peter Percival had worked and lived.

An interest in paleolithic life was inspired by the work of Joseph Prestwich in 1859. In 1863, the year after his archaeological survey began, he discovered the first conclusive Paleolithic stone tool (a hand axe) in India. He found the tool in southern India (Pallavaram, near Madras). After the discovery he, along with William King, went on to discover more such tools and settlements in Southern and Western India.

Foote spent 33 years (starting at age 24) working for the geological survey.

As a geologist, one of his significant contribution to Indian Geology was the  "Geological Features of the South Mahratta Country and Adjacent Districts" (i.e. Border districts of Maharashtra, Karnataka and Andhra Pradesh States in India).

He died on 29 December 1912 and was cremated at Calcutta, his ashes were deposited at Holy Trinity Church, Yercaud, Tamil Nadu, India. There is a memorial to him there. Foote was a Fellow of the Geological Society, London from 1867 and a Fellow of the Royal Anthropological Institute.

Foote built a valuable collection as a result of 40 years of geological and pre-historic expeditions in various parts of western and southern India.

Foote's collection of antiquities were all sold to the Madras Government Museum in 1906, where it is quoted to be a valuable treasure.

His grandson was Major General Henry Bowreman Foote, who was the recipient of the Victoria Cross for his contributions in the defence of the realm during the Second World War (World War 2).

See also
Madrasian culture

References

External links
Museum article which discusses Foote's contributions
Indian prehistory 
An introduction to Indian prehistory
Article by the Prehistory Society
Effect of Foote's work on modern archeological finds

1834 births
1912 deaths
Scottish geologists
Scottish archaeologists
British people in colonial India